Hermann Heller may refer to:

Hermann Heller (legal scholar) (1891–1933), German legal scholar and philosopher
Hermann Heller (Swiss politician) (1850–1917)